José Tragó y Arana (Madrid, 1857–1934) was a Spanish pianist and composer.

He was a student of Albéniz. He taught piano at Madrid Royal Conservatory. Among his students were Manuel de Falla, Joaquín Turina, José Muñoz Molleda, Enrique Granados, Dulce María Serret, Vicente Zurrón, Javier Alfonso, soprano :es:Fidela Campiña, composer María Rodrigo and many others.

References

1857 births
1934 deaths
Spanish pianists